Hope in Dirt City is the third album by Canadian rapper Cadence Weapon. It was released on May 29, 2012 on Upper Class Recordings.

Release
The music video for the first single "Conditioning" was released in April 2012.

The whole album can be streamed on the Exclaim! website since May 22, 2012.

Reception

The album was named as a shortlisted nominee for the 2012 Polaris Music Prize, the second time a Cadence Weapon album has been on the Polaris shortlist. He was previously nominated in 2006 for his debut album Breaking Kayfabe.

Track listing

References

2012 albums
Cadence Weapon albums
Upper Class Recordings albums